Richard S. Jaffe (born February 27, 1950) is an American lawyer, legal analyst, leadership coach, and author of Quest for Justice: Defending the Damned. Jaffe is considered one of the foremost experts and lecturers on criminal law in America and is frequently called upon to comment on death penalty issues and other areas of criminal law by national television, radio and print media.

Jaffe is best known for leading the exonerations of three death row inmates in Alabama, and for representing Centennial Olympic Park bomber Eric Robert Rudolph. Jaffe has successfully defended hundreds of individuals accused of murder, including more than sixty cases where the defendant faced the death penalty. He tried twenty-two of those cases to conclusion to a jury. In Alabama, six people have been exonerated from death row. Jaffe served as lead lawyer in four of them: James Willie “Bo” Cochran, Randal Padgett, Gary Drinkard and Wesley Quick (on appeal). None of Jaffe’s clients are on death row nor have been executed. In addition, Jaffe served as lead counsel, at the behest of the ACLU, in the case of State of Alabama versus Montez Spradley, who was also on death row. Jaffe's efforts led to Spradley being released from Alabama's death row.

Early career 
Jaffe began his career as a prosecutor. In 1976, then State of Alabama Attorney General Bill Baxley hired him as an Assistant Attorney General in the criminal appellate division. In 1977–1978 he served as a Deputy District attorney for Tuscaloosa County, Alabama where he tried serious felony cases of all types before moving to Birmingham and opening a private practice concentrating on criminal defense.

Jaffe is a former faculty member at Miles Law School. Jaffe taught criminal law and evidence. From 2000 to 2008, Jaffe served as the co-counsel along with Emory Anthony for Birmingham, Alabama Mayor Bernard Kincaid.

Jaffe is also a certified professional coach. He received his certification from CTI and soon thereafter started A Coach for Champions, Inc.

Legal practice 
Jaffe is the Senior Partner of the Birmingham, Alabama law firm of Jaffe, Hanle, Whisonant & Knight, P.C. The firm concentrates in criminal defense, with Jaffe concentrating in the areas of white collar criminal defense and criminal litigation in the federal and state courts.

Alabama Death Penalty Assessment Team 
Jaffe was a member of the American Bar Association’s Alabama Death Penalty Assessment Team. The eight-person assessment team spent nearly two years collecting and analyzing various laws, rules, procedures, standards, and guidelines relating to the administration of the death penalty in Alabama. In 2006, the Alabama Assessment Team released a report finding major flaws in the state’s administration of the death penalty, and recommended a moratorium on all executions until the legislature could reform the capital punishment system.

Awards and recognition 
The American College of Trial Lawyers inducted Jaffe as a fellow in 2013.

Jaffe served as president of the Alabama Criminal Defense Association (ACDL) in 2001. He is the founder of the Greater Birmingham Criminal Defense Attorneys Association (GBCDLA).

In 2002, Jaffe was awarded the Roderick Beddow Award, the Alabama Criminal Defense Lawyer Association's most prestigious award for service in the criminal defense field.

In 2019, Jaffe was inducted into the "Hall of Fame Attorneys" by B-Metro Magazine.

In 2012, Jaffe received a NAACP community service award.

Publications and training 
Jaffe has served as a faculty member for the Bryan R. Shechmeister Death Penalty College and the Clarence Darrow Death Penalty College. He also served as a faculty member for the Tennessee Trial Lawyers college.

Jaffe is the author of the book Quest for Justice: Defending the Damned, a memoir published by New Horizon Press in 2012 that chronicles his legal career. The book provides details into some of Jaffe’s highest profile murder cases as well as his representation of Olympic and Birmingham bomber Eric Rudolph.
In 2020 The National Association of Criminal Defense Lawyers (NACDLPress) published the 2nd Edition of Quest for Justice: Defending the Damned.

Jaffe has published numerous articles in "The Champion," the official magazine of the National Association of Criminal Defense Lawyers. Some of Jaffe's articles have explore the exoneration of the Scottsboro Boys, preparing for the prosecutor's expert witness, the principles on cross-examination, and interrogation tactics.

Adaptations 
Two of Jaffe's clients, Bo Cochran and Randal Padgett, were profiled in the off-Broadway theater production of The Exonerated by Jessica Blank and Erik Jensen. The play was later adapted into a made-for-cable movie. During the development of the play, the playwrights consulted Jaffe on details surrounding both cases, interviewing him and his clients on multiple occasions.

References

External links 
 rjaffelaw.com
 questforjusticethebook.com

American lawyers
1950 births
Living people